Emil Arthur Gutheil (January 21, 1889 – July 7, 1959) was a Polish-American psychiatrist specializing in human sexuality, music therapy, and psychoanalysis. He was a founder of the Association for the Advancement of Psychotherapy and editor of the American Journal of Psychotherapy.

Life and career
Gutheil was born in Poland and educated at the University of Vienna. He was neuro-psychiatrist at the University Clinic and served as personal assistant to Wilhelm Stekel. He co-founded the Active-analytic Clinic in Vienna, but emigrated with his wife to the United States in the late 1930s, fearing Nazi persecution. He served at the psychiatric clinic of Mount Sinai Hospital, New York. Gutheil edited Stekel's autobiography.

Gutheil died in New York City following a heart attack. The Gutheil Library at Baruch College and the Gutheil Memorial Conference of the Association for the Advancement of Psychotherapy are named in his honor.

Selected publications
Gutheil EA (1930). An analysis of a case of transvestism. In Stekel, Sexual Aberrations; the Phenomenon of Fetishism in Relation to Sex. Liveright, pp. 345–351.
Gutheil EA (1934). Analysis of a Case of Migraine. Psychoanalytic Review, 21:272-299
Gutheil EA (1939). The Language of the Dream. M.D. New York - The Macmillan Company.
Gutheil EA (1944). Psychoanalysis and brief psychotherapy. J. Clin. Psychopath. & Psychotherapy, vol. VI, pp. 207–230.
Gutheil EA (1947). Occupational neurosis in a musician. Am J Psychother. 1947 Oct;1(4):448-67. 
Gutheil EA (1947). A rare case of sadomasochism. Am J Psychother. 1947 Jan;1(1):87-92. 
Gutheil EA (1948). Dream and suicide. Am J Psychother. 1999 Spring;53(2):246-57. 
Gutheil EA (1948). Training in psychotherapy. Am J Psychother. 1948 Oct;2(4):676-89. 
Gutheil EA (1949). On the margin. Am J Psychother. 1949 Jul;3(3):430-3. 
Gutheil EA (1951). The handbook of dream analysis. Liveright. 1970 reprint 
Stekel W, Gutheil EA, eds. (1952). Patterns of psychosexual infantilism. Liveright, 
Gutheil EA (1952). Music and your emotions. Liveright. 1970 reprint 
Gutheil EA (1952). Does psychotherapy dormant psychoses? Am J Psychother. 1952 Oct;6(4):673-6. 
Gutheil EA (1954). Music as adjunct to psychotherapy. Am J Psychother. 1954 Jan;8(1):94-109. 
Gutheil EA (1954). The psychologic background of transsexualism and transvestism. Am J Psychother. 1954 Apr;8(2):231-9.  
Gutheil EA (1955). Current trends in psychotherapy. J Med Soc N J. 1955 Nov;52(11):580-5. 
Gutheil EA (1955). Pseudoneurotic forms of depressive psychosis. Am J Psychother. 1955 Oct;9(4):719-36. 
Gutheil EA (1958). Public education in preventive psychiatry. Am J Psychother. 1958 Oct;12(4):826-30. 
Gutheil EA (1958). Dreams as an aid in evaluating ego strength. Am J Psychother. 1958 Apr;12(2):338-57. 
Gutheil EA (1959). Reactive depressions. Reactive depressions. In S. Arieti (Ed.), American handbook of psychiatry, Vol. 1. New York: Basic Books, 1959.
Gutheil EA (1959). Problems of therapy in obsessive-compulsive neurosis. Am J Psychother. 1959 Oct;13:793-808. 
Stekel W, Gutheil EA, Wertham F, van Teslaar JS (1961). Auto-erotism: a psychiatric study of masturbation and neurosis. Grove Press
Gutheil EA (1962). The exhibitionism of Jean Jacques Rousseau. An abstract of Stekel's analysis. Am J Psychother. 1962 Apr;16:266-77.

References

External links
PCMH History: Gutheil Library via Baruch College

1889 births
1959 deaths
University of Vienna alumni
Polish emigrants to the United States
Polish psychiatrists
American psychiatrists